In a Lonely Place is a 1950 American film noir directed by Nicholas Ray and starring Humphrey Bogart and Gloria Grahame, produced for Bogart's Santana Productions. The script was written by Andrew P. Solt from Edmund H. North's adaptation of Dorothy B. Hughes' 1947 novel of the same name.

Bogart stars as Dixon (Dix) Steele, a troubled, violence-prone screenwriter suspected of murder. Grahame co-stars as Laurel Gray, a lonely neighbor who falls under his spell. Beyond its surface plot of confused identity and tormented love, the story is a mordant comment on Hollywood mores and the pitfalls of celebrity and near-celebrity, similar to two other American films released that same year, Billy Wilder's Sunset Boulevard and Joseph L. Mankiewicz's All About Eve.

Although less famous than his other work, Bogart's performance is considered by many critics to be among his finest and the film's reputation has grown over time, along with Ray's. It is now considered one of the best films noir of all time, as evidenced by its inclusion on the Time "All-Time 100 Movies" list as well as Slant Magazines "100 Essential Films" and it is ranked number one on Slant's "The 100 Best Film Noirs of All Time". The BBC ranked it number 89 in their list of the 100 greatest American films of all time. In 2007, In a Lonely Place was selected for preservation in the United States National Film Registry by the Library of Congress as being "culturally, historically, or aesthetically significant."

Plot

Dixon "Dix" Steele is a down-on-his-luck Hollywood screenwriter who has not had a successful movie since before World War II. While driving to meet his agent, Mel Lippman, Dix’s explosive temper is revealed when, at a stoplight, he engages with another motorist in a confrontation that almost becomes violent. Meeting with Mel at a nightclub, Dix is cajoled into adapting a book for a movie. The hat-check girl, Mildred Atkinson, is engrossed in reading the copy meant for Dix; since she only has a few pages left to go, she asks to be allowed to finish it. Dix claims to be too tired to read the novel, so he asks Mildred to go home with him to explain the plot. As they enter the courtyard of his apartment, they pass a new tenant, Laurel Gray. Mildred describes the story, confirming what Dix had suspected—the book is no good. Rather than drive her home as promised, he gives her cab fare instead.

The next morning, Dix is awakened by his friend, police detective Brub Nicolai, who served under Dix during the war. Nicolai takes him downtown to be questioned by his superior, Captain Lochner, who reveals that Mildred was murdered and informs Dix that he is a suspect. Dix remembers that Laurel saw him letting Mildred out of his apartment, which Laurel confirms when brought in for questioning. Afterwards Dix strikes up conversation with Laurel and their mutual attraction is evident. When he gets home, Dix checks up on Laurel. He finds she is an aspiring actress with only a few low-budget films to her credit. They begin to fall in love and, with Laurel assisting him, Dix enthusiastically goes back to work, much to Mel’s delight.

At a dinner with Nicolai and his wife Sylvia, Dix has them re-enact the murder as he imagines it; his odd behavior leads Sylvia to doubt his innocence. Captain Lochner meets with Laurel again and sows seeds of doubt in her mind, pointing out Dix’s record of violent behavior. Laurel confides in Sylvia her growing doubts about Dix.

At a nightclub with Laurel, Dix spots Ted Barton, another detective, arriving with a female companion. Dix angrily leaves, believing that Barton is tailing him. Later, Laurel’s masseuse Martha warns her about Dix’s chequered romantic past, and Laurel grows irritated, kicking her out of the apartment. At a beach party with the Nicolais, Sylvia inadvertently reveals Laurel’s follow-up meeting with Lochner; Dix furiously storms off. Laurel follows and gets into Dix’s car; he drives erratically and at speed until they sideswipe another car. Nobody is hurt, but when the other driver accosts him, Dix beats him unconscious and is about to strike him with a large rock when Laurel stops him.

Dix goes to the police station and attempts to clear his name, inadvertently meeting Mildred’s boyfriend Henry Kesler, who works at a bank. Dix remarks to Nicolai that Kesler is a better suspect as he has a motive. At the Nicolai residence, Laurel asks Sylvia about Dix prompting the Nicolais to re-enact the murder, and tells her about Dix’s roadside assault.

Eventually, Laurel’s doubts about Dix’s innocence result in her being unable to sleep without taking pills. When he asks her to marry him, she accepts, but only because she is scared of how he might react if she refuses. Mel comes over to celebrate while Dix is away, only to find out that Laurel does not want to go through with the marriage and is making plans to escape to New York. She urges Mel to bring Dix’s completed script to a producer.

At a dinner to celebrate the engagement, Dix is annoyed to learn that Mel has submitted his script without his consent. Dix then intercepts a telephone call meant for Laurel at the table, angrily discovering it is Martha and slugging Mel when he tries to intervene.

Back at Laurel’s apartment, Dix flies into a rage when he sees that she has removed her engagement ring. After briefly calming down, Dix answers the phone, learning of Laurel’s intended flight to New York. He again becomes violent, almost strangling Laurel before regaining control of himself when the phone rings again. It is Nicolai, who informs Dix and Laurel that Kesler has confessed to Mildred’s murder. However, both Dix and Laurel realise that it is too late to salvage their relationship. Laurel watches in tears as Dix slowly walks away across the courtyard to his apartment.

Cast

 Humphrey Bogart as Dixon Steele
 Gloria Grahame as Laurel Gray
 Frank Lovejoy as Det. Sgt. Brub Nicolai
 Carl Benton Reid as Captain Lochner
 Art Smith as Mel Lippman
 Martha Stewart as Mildred Atkinson
 Jeff Donnell as Sylvia Nicolai
 Robert Warwick as Charlie Waterman
 Morris Ankrum as Lloyd Barnes
 William Ching as Det. Ted Barton
 Steven Geray as Paul, Headwaiter
 Hadda Brooks as Singer
Jack Reynolds as Henry Kesler

Background

When Edmund H. North adapted the story, he stuck close to the original source and John Derek was considered for the role of Steele because in the novel the character was much younger. North's treatment was not used. Andrew Solt developed the screenplay with regular input from producer Robert Lord and director Nicholas Ray, and the end result is far different from the source novel. Solt claimed that Bogart loved the script so much that he wanted to make it without revisions – Solt maintains that the final cut is very close to his script – but further research shows that Ray made regular rewrites, some added on the day of shooting. In fact, only four pages of the 140-page script had no revisions. The film was produced by Bogart's Santana Productions company, whose first film was Knock on Any Door (1949), which was directed by Ray and starred Bogart and Derek in the leading roles.

Louise Brooks wrote in her essay "Humphrey and Bogey" that she felt it was the role of Dixon Steele in this movie that came closest to the real Bogart she knew.
Before inertia set in, he played one fascinatingly complex character, craftily directed by Nicholas Ray, in a film whose title perfectly defined Humphrey's own isolation among people. In a Lonely Place gave him a role that he could play with complexity because the character's pride in his art, his selfishness, his drunkenness, his lack of energy stabbed with lightning strokes of violence, were shared equally by the real Bogart.
Apparently, on one voyage on their yacht Santana, Bogart showed an inexplicable burst of rage that frightened his wife Lauren Bacall.

The original ending had Steele strangling Gray to death in the heat of their argument. Sgt. Nicolai comes to tell Steele that he has been cleared of Mildred's murder but arrests him for killing Gray. Steele tells Brub that he is finally finished with his screenplay; the final shot was to be of a page in the typewriter which has the significant lines Steele said to Gray in the car (which he admitted to not knowing where to put) "I was born when she kissed me, I died when she left me, I lived a few weeks while she loved me". This scene was filmed halfway through the shooting schedule, but Ray hated the ending he had helped write. Ray later said, "I just couldn't believe the ending that Bundy (screenwriter Andrew Solt) and I had written. I shot it because it was my obligation to do it. Then I kicked everybody off stage except Bogart, Art Smith and Gloria. And we improvised the ending as it is now. In the original ending we had ribbons so it was all tied up into a very neat package, with Lovejoy coming in and arresting him as he was writing the last lines, having killed Gloria. Huh! And I thought, shit, I can't do it, I just can't do it! Romances don't have to end that way. Marriages don't have to end that way, they don't have to end in violence. Let the audience make up its own mind what's going to happen to Bogie when he goes outside the apartment."

Bacall and Ginger Rogers were considered for the role of Laurel Gray. Bacall was a natural choice given her off-screen marriage to Bogart and their box-office appeal, but Warner Bros. refused to loan her out, a move often thought to be in reaction to Bogart having set up his own independent production company, the type of which Warner Bros. were afraid would jeopardize the future of the major studios. Rogers was the producers' first choice but Ray believed that his wife Gloria Grahame was right for the part. Even though their marriage was troubled, he insisted that she be cast. Her performance today is unanimously considered to be among her finest.

Grahame and Ray's marriage was starting to come apart during filming. Grahame was forced to sign a contract stipulating that "my husband [Ray] shall be entitled to direct, control, advise, instruct and even command my actions during the hours from 9 AM to 6 PM, every day except Sunday ... I acknowledge that in every conceivable situation his will and judgment shall be considered superior to mine and shall prevail." Grahame was also forbidden to "nag, cajole, tease or in any other feminine fashion seek to distract or influence him." The two did separate during filming. Afraid that one of them would be replaced, Ray took to sleeping in a dressing room, lying and saying that he needed to work on the script. Grahame played along with the charade and nobody knew that they had separated. Though there was a brief reconciliation, the couple divorced in 1952.

The film was one of two Nicholas Ray films to be scored by avant garde classical composer George Antheil (1900–1959). The production began on October 25, 1949 and ended on December 1, 1949.

Reception

Critical response
At the time of its original release, the reviews were generally positive (in particular many critics praised Bogart and Grahame's performances), but many questioned the marketability given the bleak ending. The staff at Variety magazine in May 1950 gave the film a good review and wrote,
In In a Lonely Place Humphrey Bogart has a sympathetic role though cast as one always ready to mix it with his dukes. He favors the underdog; in one instance he virtually has a veteran, brandy-soaking character actor (out of work) on his very limited payroll ... Director Nicholas Ray maintains nice suspense. Bogart is excellent. Gloria Grahame, as his romance, also rates kudos.

Bosley Crowther lauded the film, especially Bogart's performance and the screenplay, writing, 
Everybody should be happy this morning. Humphrey Bogart is in top form in his latest independently made production, In a Lonely Place, and the picture itself is a superior cut of melodrama. Playing a violent, quick-tempered Hollywood movie writer suspected of murder, Mr. Bogart looms large on the screen of the Paramount Theatre and he moves flawlessly through a script which is almost as flinty as the actor himself. Andrew Solt, who fashioned the screenplay from a story by Dorothy B. Hughes and an adaptation by Edmund H. North, has had the good sense to resolve the story logically. Thus Dixon Steele remains as much of an enigma, an explosive, contradictory force at loose ends when the film ends as when it starts.
Not unlike Ray's debut They Live by Night (1948), it was advertised as a straight thriller although the film does not fit easily into one genre, as the marketing shows. Ray's films had a brief revival in the 1970s and Bogart's anti-hero stance gained a following in the 1960s, and the French Cahiers du cinéma critics during the 1950s praised Ray's unique film making. Time magazine, which gave the film a negative review upon its initial release, called it one of the 100 best films of all time in their 2005 list.

Critic Ed Gonzalez wrote in 2001, "Not unlike Albert Camus' The Stranger, Nicholas Ray's remarkable In a Lonely Place represents the purest of existentialist primers ... Gray and Dixon may love each other but it's evident that they're both entirely too victimized by their own selves to sustain this kind of happiness. In the end, their love resembles a rehearsal for the next and hopefully less complicated romance. This is the existential endgame of one of Ray's smartest and most devastating masterpieces."

Curtis Hanson is featured on the retrospective documentary of the DVD release showing his admiration for the film, notably Ray's direction, the dark depiction of Hollywood and Bogart's performance. This was one of the films which he showed to actors Russell Crowe and Guy Pearce in preparation for filming L.A. Confidential.  He said, "I wanted them to see the reality of that period and to see that emotion. This movie, and I'm not saying it's the greatest movie ever made, but it represents many things that I think are worth aspiring to, such as having character and emotion be the driving force, rather than the plot. ... When I first saw In a Lonely Place as a teenager, it frightened me and yet attracted me with an almost hypnotic power. Later, I came to understand why. Occasionally, very rarely, a movie feels so heartfelt, so emotional, so revealing that it seems as though both the actor and the director are standing naked before the audience. When that kind of marriage happens between actor and director, it's breathtaking."

In 2009, film critic Roger Ebert added In a Lonely Place to his "great movies" list.

The review aggregator Rotten Tomatoes reported that 96% of critics gave the film positive reviews, with an average rating of 8.7/10, based on 49 reviews. The website's critics consensus reads: "Led by extraordinary performances from Humphrey Bogart and Gloria Grahame, In a Lonely Place is a gripping noir of uncommon depth and maturity."

In popular culture
The 1986 song "In a Lonely Place" by the Smithereens, from the album Especially For You, was inspired by the film. Its chorus, "I was born the day I met you, lived a while when you loved me, died a little when we broke apart," is taken directly from the movie's dialogue.

Comparisons to novel

In a Lonely Place was based on the 1947 novel of the same name by Dorothy B. Hughes. Some controversy exists between admirers of the film and admirers of the novel (who view the film as a watered down adaptation), as Edmund H. North's script takes some elements of the novel but is ultimately a different story. Hughes was not bothered by the changes made by North and praised Grahame's performance as Gray.

The strongest difference between the two works lies in the protagonist; the film's Dixon Steele is a screenwriter with an unconventional life and a decent person with fatally poor impulse control, prone to wild overreaction when enraged. The novel's Steele is a limited third-person view from Steele's perspective, reminiscent of the first-person in noir, à la The Killer Inside Me. Steele is a charlatan who pretends to be a novelist while sponging money from his overbearing uncle. While still receiving what he perceives as a small monthly allowance from his uncle, Steele murders a wealthy young man and assumes his identity, in a manner similar to Patricia Highsmith's Tom Ripley. (Hughes' character pre-dates Ripley and may have influenced him.) The film follows the question of whether Steele finally went too far in his anger and committed the murder to a tragic end. Even though he is proved innocent, his rage at the cloud of suspicion has driven the woman he loves away for good. No question of Steele's innocence exists in the novel, which follows the investigation of a murder Steele plainly committed and his interference in the investigation for his own ends.

Curtis Hanson, in the DVD featurette 'In A Lonely Place Revisited', further analyses the similarities and differences between the novel and the film. He notes that there is a parallel in the film between Steele's adaptation of a novel for film and the adaptation of In a Lonely Place for film. He also notes that a difference between Steele in the film and Steele in the novel is their respective treatment of women. In the novel Steele pursues women and the first chapter details his pursuit of a woman. In the film, Steele is pursued by women.

Hughes' novel was out of print for decades, until re-released by The Feminist Press at CUNY in 2003, which edition was still in print in 2010. Penguin Books published a paperback edition in the UK in 2010 as part of their Modern Classics imprint, and the Library of America included it in the first volume of their "Women Crime Writers" collection. Second-hand copies are readily available.

References

External links

 
 
 
 
 
 In a Lonely Place DVD restoration review at Bright Lights Film Journal
 In a Lonely Place article at Senses of Cinema by Serena Bramble
In a Lonely Place: An Epitaph for Love an essay by Imogen Sara Smith at the Criterion Collection
In a Lonely Place essay by Daniel Eagan in America's Film Legacy: The Authoritative Guide to the Landmark Movies in the National Film Registry, A&C Black, 2010 , pages 435-436 

1950 films
1950 romantic drama films
American romantic drama films
American black-and-white films
Columbia Pictures films
1950s English-language films
Film noir
Films about Hollywood, Los Angeles
Films about screenwriters
Films based on American novels
Films based on works by Dorothy B. Hughes
Films set in Beverly Hills, California
Films shot in Los Angeles County, California
Films directed by Nicholas Ray
Films scored by George Antheil
United States National Film Registry films
1950s American films